The Kushiyara River is a distributary river in Bangladesh and Assam, India. It forms on the India-Bangladesh border as a branch of the Barak River, when the Barak separates into the Kushiyara and Surma. The waters that eventually form the Kushiyara originate in the uplands of the state of Assam and pick up tributaries from Nagaland and Manipur.

From its origin at the mouth of the Barak, also known as the Amlshid bifurcation point, the Kushiyara flows westward forming the boundary between Assam, India, and the Sylhet District of Bangladesh. It flows between the towns of Zakigonj, Sylhet, and Karīmganj, Assam, and after the village of Pānjipuri enters entirely into the Beanibazar Upazila of Bangladesh. It then flows southwestward past the village of Deulgrām in Kurar Bazar Union where the river turns southward passing the village of Badepasha, Uttar Bade Pasha Union, Golapganj Upazila, where it again turns southwestward. It is joined from the left (east) by the Juri River at Fenchuganj Bazar. At Beel Pond (Pukhuri Beel) the river turns westward where it flows past the village of Balaganj Bazar in Balaganj Upazila, then southwestward past the villages of Hamjāpur, Abdullāpur and Manumukh. The river, after being joined from the left (south) by the Manu River (Monu River), flows northwest past the villages of Aorangapur, Tajpur, and Pāilgaon, where it is joined by the small Itakhola River and assumes a westward direction. After the village of Mārkuli the river heads southwest past the village of Pāhārpur to the village of Ajmiriganj Bazar. After that the river forms several braided streams and heads south where it is joined by the Khowai River from the left (east) and heads southwest where it is rejoined by the Surma (locally known as the Danu River) from the right (north) and becomes the Meghna River, just north of the town of Bhairab Bazar. Altogether, the Kushiyara runs about 160 kilometers. At its deepest during the rainy season the Kushiyara can reach a depth of 10 meters. During the dry season it can appear to dry up almost completely in a few places with the bulk of the load being carried subsurface, such as in the braided stream area south of Ajmiriganj Bazar.

In 2022 India and Bangldesh signed an interim water sharing pact with regard to the Kushiyara River.

See also
 List of rivers in Bangladesh

Notes and references

 बांग्लादेश and
 भारत 25 अगस्त 2022 को समझौता हो गया है 

International rivers of Asia
Rivers of Bangladesh
Rivers of Nagaland
Rivers of Assam
Bay of Bengal
Sylhet District
Distributaries of the Ganges
Fenchuganj Upazila
Rivers of India
Rivers of Sylhet Division